Guardians of the Galaxy is an animated television series based on the comic book super hero team known as Guardians of the Galaxy. The series premiered on Disney XD on August 1, 2015, as part of the Marvel Universe block.

Series overview

Episodes

Season 1 (2015–16)

Season 2 (2017)

Season 3: Mission: Breakout! (2018–19)

Shorts

Season 1 (Aug 2015)

Season 2 (Feb–Mar 2017)

References

Lists of Marvel Comics animated series episodes
Lists of American children's animated television series episodes